Maverick Canyon is a steep-sided canyon in the Pequop Mountains of Elko County, Nevada, United States. Interstate 80 traverses the canyon as it ascends the Pequop Mountains from the west.

References

Interstate 80
Landforms of Elko County, Nevada
Canyons and gorges of Nevada